DTDP-4-amino-4,6-dideoxy-D-glucose acyltransferase (VIOB) is an enzyme with systematic name acetyl-CoA:dTDP-4-amino-4,6-dideoxy-alpha-D-glucose N-acetyltransferase. This enzyme catalyses the following chemical reaction

 acetyl-CoA + dTDP-4-amino-4,6-dideoxy-alpha-D-glucose  CoA + dTDP-4-acetamido-4,6-dideoxy-alpha-D-glucose

4-acetamido-4,6-dideoxy-alpha-D-glucose is part of the O antigens of Shigella dysenteriae type 7 and Escherichia coli O7.

References

External links 
 

EC 2.3.1